The İzmir Blue Train is one of the 3, still operating, "Blue Train" services.

Historically the train was operating between Alsancak station in İzmir and Central Station in Ankara. But in 2006, due to construction works of Egeray, the departure was transferred to Basmane station, but remained there even after the end of constructions. And since 2016, the eastern terminus of the service was shortened to Eskişehir due to the Başkentray project. In 2018, service started between Ankara-İzmir.

References

External links

Named passenger trains of Turkey
Railway services introduced in 1983
1983 establishments in Turkey